Pybliographer is a reference management software tool that deals with bibliographic databases, used for viewing, editing, searching, and reformatting bibliographies. Written in Python and licensed under GNU GPL, it provides a scripting framework of classes and functions, which makes it extendable to many other applications.  Documentation is available.

In addition to the scripting environment, pybliographer provides a graphical GTK+-based interface called Pybliographic, allowing many customizable viewing and editing possibilities. The interface can also be used to insert references directly into LyX, Kile or OpenOffice.org, direct queries to Medline, and more.

File formats supported 

 BibTeX
 ISI
 Medline
 Ovid
 PubMed
 Refer

See also 

 Comparison of reference management software

References

External links
 

Reference management software
Free reference management software
Free software programmed in Python
Linux TeX software
Software that uses GTK
Software that uses PyGTK